Vasily Vorobyov (born 25 May 1971) is a Belarusian freestyle skier. He competed at the 1994 Winter Olympics and the 1998 Winter Olympics.

References

1971 births
Living people
Belarusian male freestyle skiers
Olympic freestyle skiers of Belarus
Freestyle skiers at the 1994 Winter Olympics
Freestyle skiers at the 1998 Winter Olympics
Sportspeople from Minsk